Sturt Street may refer to:
Sturt Street, Adelaide
Sturt Street, Ballarat, location of the Sturt Street Gardens